Tom Erik Breive (born 18 April 1980 in Steigen) is a retired Norwegian football midfielder who played for Oslo Øst, Skeid and Sarpsborg 08. He is known as a free kick specialist.

References

1980 births
Living people
People from Steigen
Norwegian footballers
Association football midfielders
Skeid Fotball players
Sarpsborg 08 FF players
Norwegian First Division players
Eliteserien players
Sportspeople from Nordland